Fresh Meat is a British comedy-drama series shown on Channel 4 which was created by Jesse Armstrong and Sam Bain. The plot centres on six students of the fictional Manchester Medlock University. The show stars Zawe Ashton as Vod, Greg McHugh as Howard, Kimberley Nixon as Josie, Charlotte Ritchie as Oregon, Joe Thomas as Kingsley, Jack Whitehall as JP and Faye Marsay as Candice.

The first series, released in 2011, aired on Wednesdays at 10 pm, while the second series aired on Tuesdays at 10 pm in 2012. The third series, which began running in November 2013, aired on Mondays at 10 pm. The fourth and final series began transmission in February 2016, airing on Mondays at 10pm.

Series overview

Episodes

Series 1 (2011)

Series 2 (2012)

Series 3 (2013)
A third series was commissioned in November 2012 and premiered on 28 October 2013 via 4oD, before transmission on Channel 4 the following week, on 4 November.

Series 4 (2016)

References

Channel 4-related lists
Lists of British comedy television series episodes